Buddam is a village in Guntur district of the Indian state of Andhra Pradesh. It is located in Karlapalem mandal of Tenali revenue division.

History 

The name Buddam emerged from Bouddha Aramam (Monastery). The archaeological department located many Buddhist relics in and around this village and a few of them are preserved in Amaravati and Hyderabad. A large hoard of bronze Buddhist sculptures dating from the 8th Century AD was found in Buddam in the nineteenth century and is now in the British Museum.

Geography 

Governance 

Buddam gram panchayat is the local self-government of the village. It is divided into wards and each ward is represented by a ward member.

Education 

As per the school information report for the academic year 2018–19, the village has only one Mandal Parishad schools.

Visiting place 
Pavanakumar - Lord Anjaneya temple Established by Late Siddha Purusha "Sri Ramsharan Maharaj", the statue was touched really by Lord Anjaneya before the Idol establishment.
In Buddham village, there is a powerful hanuman idol even today, that has many miraculous incidents associated with it. It is called "Pavan Kumar". It was installed by a great mantra Siddha "SriRamSaranMaharaj" alias "Sri Kundurthi Venkata narasaiah paakayaaji". In this video, wonderful incidents from Maharaj's life and the incident behind the installation of Sri. Pavan Kumar is described. Here is the link to their website www.sadgurusriramasaran.com.

See also 
List of villages in Guntur district

References

External links 

Villages in Guntur district
Buddhist sites in Andhra Pradesh
Religious buildings and structures in Guntur district